Abangares may refer to:
Abangares (canton), a canton in the Guanacaste province in Costa Rica
Abangares River, a river in Costa Rica